Transport in Luxembourg is ensured principally by road, rail and air. There are also services along the river Moselle which forms the border with Germany. The road network has been significantly modernised in recent years with motorways to adjacent countries. The advent of the high-speed TGV link to Paris has led to renovation of the capital's main railway station while a new passenger terminal at Luxembourg Airport has recently been opened.  Trams in the capital were reintroduced in December 2017 and there are plans for light-rail and/or tram-train lines in adjacent areas.

All public transport in Luxembourg (buses, trams, and trains) has been free to use since 29 February 2020, as part of a larger mobility experiment with goals to increase walking for short trips, increase bicycling, and increase the transit ridership sharply as the network is enlarged and service frequency is increased.

Railways 

Operated by Chemins de Fer Luxembourgeois (CFL), Luxembourg's railways form the backbone of the country's public transport network, linking the most important towns. The total length of operational (standard gauge) track is 274 km, though it was some 550 km at the end of the Second World War. There are regular services from Luxembourg City to Ettelbruck, Esch-sur-Alzette, Wasserbillig and Kleinbettingen while international routes extend to Trier, Koblenz, Brussels, Liège, Metz and Nancy.

The railway network links into Belgium, Germany and France. Some of the cross-border services are run by CFL, others by SNCF, NMBS/SNCB and DB.

There is now a frequent high-speed connection to Paris via the LGV Est line. EuroCap-Rail is a proposed high-speed axis connecting Brussels, Luxembourg (city), and Strasbourg.

Roads

Road network

The six Luxembourg motorways cover a total distance of 165 km, linking the capital with Trier (Germany), Thionville (France) and Arlon (Belgium) as well as with Esch-sur-Alzette and Ettelbruck in Luxembourg. Luxembourg's motorways are toll free. The speed limit is normally 130 km/h, 110 km/h in rainy weather. With 56.8 km of motorway per 1,000 km2, Luxembourg probably now has the highest density of motorways in Europe.

Luxembourg City is a major business and financial center. Many workers prefer to live in the three neighboring countries and drive to work each day. This creates huge traffic jams during peak commuting hours. Tailbacks on the E411 motorway can extend five or more kilometers into Belgium and can take an hour or more to navigate.

The remaining road network in Luxembourg accounts for a total length of 2,730 km, consisting of 839 km of trunk roads (RN or routes nationales) and 1,891 km of secondary roads (CR or chemins repris).

Bus services

Comprehensive bus services linking the towns and villages of the Grand Duchy of Luxembourg are contracted out to private operators by the RGTR (Régime général des transports routiers) under the Ministry of Transport.

Luxembourg City is served by 163 of its own AVL (Autobus de la Ville de Luxembourg) buses transporting some 28 million passengers per year (2007). As with the RGTR, AVL contracts out to private operators for a number of services. Most of these buses are in AVL colors but the owner's name is often mentioned on them in small print. Also, the letters on the license plate can give ownership away to those that know how that system works. There are 25 regular bus routes plus special bus services through the night.

The TICE or Syndicat des Tramways Intercommunaux dans le Canton d’Esch/Alzette operates several bus routes. They are centered on the city of Esch-sur-Alzette in the southeast of the country. Most are urban and suburban routes but some extend into the surrounding countryside.

CFL, the Luxembourg railway company, operates some 17 bus routes, mainly serving towns and villages that are no longer served by rail.

A number of smaller cities like Ettelbruck and Wiltz have started their own local services, some of which reach out to nearby villages. These services are not part of the RGTR and national tickets are not always honored.

All transport companies work together under the Verkéiersverbond, which covers all bus, tram, and train routes. Starting from 29 Feb 2020, all public transport was made free throughout the territory of the Grand Duchy of Luxembourg, funded through general taxation. However first class tickets can still be purchased for use on the trains: a ticket valid for 2 hours is €3, whilst a one-day ticket is €6.

Cycling 

In the Grand Duchy of Luxembourg, the EV5 Via Romea Francigena runs  and follows a network of dedicated cycle paths from the Belgian border, through to its cliff-top capital city, and towards the French and German borders at Schengen. The EV5 follows the following national routes in Luxembourg: PC18, PC17, PC12, PC13, the Luxembourg-Ville route no. 10, PC1, PC11, PC7 and PC3.

In Luxembourg, the EV5 goes through Strassen, Luxembourg, Hesperange and Schengen. It then passes through back to France.

Trams

Luxembourg's historic tramway network closed in 1964 as part of a general decline of trams across Europe but the city reintroduced trams at the end of 2017 as part of the renaissance of tramways. The phased approach initially saw trams running through the Kirchberg quarter to the Grand Duchess Charlotte Bridge, and later Place de l'Etoile, before the line was eventually extended to the old town in Ville Haute and on towards Luxembourg railway station. Currently under construction are the extensions to the Cloche d'Or business district in the south, and Luxembourg Airport in the north. A new funicular line was also opened allowing connections between trams running along the Kirchberg approach to the Grand Duchess Charlotte Bridge and a new station serving a CFL rail line located in the Pfaffenthal valley below. The full tramline is planned to be completed by 2023.

Water 
The river Moselle forms a 42 km natural border between Luxembourg and Germany in the southeast of the country. In the summer months, the Princess Marie-Astrid and a few other tourist boats operate regular services along the river.

Mertert near Grevenmacher on the Moselle is Luxembourg's only commercial port. With two quays covering a total length of 1.6 km, it offers facilities connecting river, road and rail transport. It is used principally for coal, steel, oil, agricultural goods and building materials. In 2016, the port handled 1.2 million tonnes of cargo.

Air 
Luxembourg Airport at Findel, some 6 km to the north of the city, is Luxembourg's only commercial airport. Thanks to its long runway (4,000 m), even the largest types of aircraft are able to use its facilities.

Luxair, Luxembourg's international airline, and Cargolux, a cargo-only airline, operate out of the airport. In 2008, the airport ranked as Europe's 5th largest and the world's 23rd by cargo tonnage.

Luxair has regular passenger services to 20 European destinations and operates tourist flights to 17 more. Other airlines operating flights to and from Luxembourg include British Airways, KLM, Scandinavian Airlines, Swiss Global Air Lines, and TAP Portugal.

A large new airport terminal building was opened in 2008 with more modern facilities, including an underground carpark.

Pipelines 
The trunk natural gas pipelines in Luxembourg have a total length of 155 km (2007).

Russia and Norway are the main producers. The Luxembourg network is connected to Germany, France and Belgium.

Merchant Navy 

Luxembourg has 150 vessels in its merchant navy. These include 4 bulk carriers, 1 container ship, 21 general cargo ships, 3 oil tankers, and 121 others.

See also
The Integrated Traffic and Landscape Concept for the Grand Duchy of Luxembourg
Plug-in electric vehicles in Luxembourg
Trams in Luxembourg

References